Touched is a 1983 American romantic drama film directed by John Flynn starring Robert Hays and Kathleen Beller.

Premise 
Two inmates of a mental institution, a man named Daniel and a woman named Jennifer, are not as ill as the psychiatrists at the institution perceive them to be. Daniel and Jennifer escape to make lives for themselves together in the world at large.

Cast

Robert Hays as Daniel
Kathleen Beller as Jennifer
Ned Beatty as Herbie
Gilbert Lewis as Ernie
Lyle Kessler as Timothy
Farnham Scott as Thomas
Meg Myles as Jennifer's Mother
Mady Kaplan as Arlene
E. Brian Dean as Dr. Willoughby
Victoria Boothby as Adele
Clarence Felder as Ralph

Production 
Touched was filmed under the working title Some Sunny Day. It features extensive scenes shot on the boardwalk in Wildwood, New Jersey, including locations on and near Morey's Piers, during the end of the summer season and the beginning of the off-season in 1982. Other amusement piers, including Hunt's Pier, can be seen in the backgrounds of scenes.

Music 
In addition to the instrumental score by Shirley Walker, the film also features the love ballad "Find Me", written by David Shire and Carol Connors, and sung by Laura Branigan, featured on her second hit album Branigan 2.

References

External links 

1983 films
1983 romantic drama films
American romantic drama films
Films directed by John Flynn
Films set in psychiatric hospitals
Films scored by Shirley Walker
Films shot in New Jersey
1980s English-language films
1980s American films